Archiephestia is a monotypic snout moth genus described by Hans Georg Amsel in 1955. Its single species, Archiephestia adpiscinella, was described by Pierre Chrétien in 1911. It was described from North Africa but is also known from Spain.

The wingspan is 6.5-10.5 mm.

References

Phycitini
Monotypic moth genera
Moths of Africa
Moths of Europe
Pyralidae genera
Taxa named by Hans Georg Amsel